Betsy Hart aka Betsy Meade (born c. 1963) is a professional writer for the conservative organization The Heritage Foundation, syndicated columnist for the Scripps Howard News and conservative commentator who is a frequent contributor to CNN and the Fox News Channel.  She also appeared frequently on ABC's show Politically Incorrect.

Works
Hart wrote a column on family and cultural issues titled “From the Hart”. The column is distributed each week to hundreds of newspapers all over the country. It appears regularly in mainstream newspapers such as the Chicago Sun-Times, the Rocky Mountain News, the Boston Herald, The Washington Times, among many others. Her radio program is titled "It Takes a Parent" and is featured on Chicago’s WYLL/AM1160 radio.

Appearances
Hart has also appeared on The Oprah Winfrey Show, where she was featured as one of America’s top five women columnists.

Family
Hart is the mother of four children and author of the book It Takes a Parent: How the Culture of Pushover Parenting is Hurting Our Kids... and What to Do About It.  She is currently working on her next book Let's Look at Things a Little Differently. She is divorced her husband after 17 years of marriage and has since married Thomas Meade, a professor of chemistry at nearby Northwestern University. She is raising her four children in Wilmette, a suburb of Chicago.

Views
Hart believes that production and consumption of organic food is less safe and more expensive than conventionally produced food, although she admits that if "people want to spend more on the stuff, that’s their deal." She does not believe that global warming is primarily a man-made condition. She thinks that comedy should not include cursing or masturbatory gestures. She also believes that schools not celebrating with Halloween parties is scary and Orwellian.

Education
In 1985 she graduated from the University of Illinois with a B.A. in Russian Studies.

References

External links
 Jewish World Review Archives
 Betsy Hart's Weblog
 

University of Illinois Urbana-Champaign alumni
1960s births
Living people
American bloggers
American columnists
American commentators
E. W. Scripps Company people
21st-century American non-fiction writers